Semisi Kioa Lafu Sika (born 31 January 1968) is a Tongan politician, businessman, and Member of the Tongan Parliament from 2010 to 2021. He served as acting prime minister in September 2019, following the death of ʻAkilisi Pōhiva. He is currently leader of the Democratic Party of the Friendly Islands.

Career and activism
Sika is from Haveluloto, and was educated at Brigham Young University–Hawaii, gaining a Bachelor of Science. Before entering politics he worked as a teacher and travel agent, and ran a takeaway shop and catering firm. He is a longstanding supporter of the democratic movement in Tonga. In 2007 he was one of three people, including Human Rights and Democracy Movement leader ʻAkilisi Pōhiva, who were prosecuted for their leadership of a protest march in June 2006. He was found not guilty and discharged.

Political career
A member of the Democratic Party of the Friendly Islands, Sika was elected to Parliament in the seat of Tongatapu 2 in the 2010 elections. He was re-elected in the 2014 and became Chairman of the Committee of the Whole House. In April 2016 he was appointed Minister of Tourism and Infrastructure.

Following the 2017 election Sika was appointed Deputy Prime Minister. in July 2019 there were calls for his resignation after he intervened to silence a speech against bullying and sexism at the Miss Pacific pageant in Tonga.

He became acting premier following the death of Prime Minister ʻAkilisi Pōhiva on 12 September 2019. He contested the Premiership, but was defeated by Pōhiva Tuʻiʻonetoa by eight votes to fifteen. Sika continues to lead the DPFI.

In December 2020 he submitted a motion of no-confidence in Prime Minister Tuʻiʻonetoa.

He contested the 2021 Tongan general election, but was unsuccessful.

References

|-

|-

|-

|-

|-

1968 births
Living people
Prime Ministers of Tonga
Members of the Legislative Assembly of Tonga
Democratic Party of the Friendly Islands politicians
Tongan businesspeople
People from Tongatapu
Brigham Young University–Hawaii alumni